Real de alerce or real de madera (Spanish for "real of Fitzroya" and "real of wood") was a local currency consisting in Fitzroya wood that was used during colonial times in Chiloé Archipelago. It was the Jesuits, established in Chiloé since the 17th century that established Fitzroya as a major export product towards the Viceroyalty of Peru. Real de alerce was also used by some encomenderos to pay their taxes.

See also

1712 Huilliche rebellion

Sources
Otero, Luis.  La huella del fuego, page 73.

History of the Captaincy General of Chile
History of Chiloé
Local currencies
History of forestry
Forestry in Chile